Rondey Robinson (born May 14, 1967) is an American former professional basketball player. He played six seasons in the Icelandic Úrvalsdeild with Njarðvík, winning the national championship three times.

College
Robinson played college basketball for Wright State under coach Ralph Underhill. He missed his senior season after a knee injury that required surgery.

Iceland
Robinson signed with Njarðvík in 1990 as player-coach. Shortly later the club decided to hire Friðrik Ingi Rúnarsson as head coach instead and let Robinson concentrate on playing. After a rough start, where the club almost let him go, his play improved markedly and at the end of the season Njarðvík won the national championship after defeating arch-rivals Keflavík in the finals. In the deciding game, Robinson had 17 points and 23 rebounds. In 1991 Icelandic All-Star game, Robinson was named the game's MVP.

With 1.4 seconds left of the fifth and deciding game of the 1994 Úrvalsdeild finals against Grindavík, Robinson made one out of two free throws that gave Njarðvík a one point victory, 68-67, and the national championship. After the season he was named the Úrvalsdeild Foreign Player of the Year.

He retired after Njarðvík's loss in the semi-finals of the 1996 Úrvalsdeild playoffs.

Personal life
Robinson grew up in Chicago with five brothers and two sisters.

External links
Wright State statistics at sports-reference.com
Úrvalsdeild statistics at kki.is

References 

1967 births
Living people
American expatriate basketball people in Iceland
American men's basketball players
Basketball players from Chicago
Centers (basketball)
Junior college men's basketball players in the United States
Njarðvík men's basketball players
Úrvalsdeild karla (basketball) players
Wright State Raiders men's basketball players